Dried lime tea, also known as chai noomi basra, noomi basra tea or loomi tea, is a type of herbal tea made from dried limes that is traditional to the Arab states of the Persian Gulf and Iraq.

Preparation
Loomi tea is made by seeding the dried limes (noomi basra) where they are cracked into several pieces, or just pricked, and their peels are simmered in water for 15 to 30 minutes until boiled. Afterwards, they are drained and the tea is sweetened with sugar. At times, honey may be preferred instead and saffron threads may also be added.

Usage
Served hot, the drink is also consumed as a remedy to aid indigestion, upset stomach, diarrhea, and nausea. It is very sour and aromatic, but can also be mildly sweet, depending on how much sugar is added. Omani dried limes have a pleasant tart citrus flavor and are rich in vitamin C.

See also
Arabic tea
Ginger tea, another herbal tea used to treat upset stomach

References

External links
 Loomi tea recipe

Arabic drinks
Iraqi cuisine
Omani cuisine
Kuwaiti cuisine
Assyrian cuisine
Herbal tea
Hot drinks
Limes (fruit)